Thomas Davenport (died November 17, 1838) was a U.S. Representative from Virginia.

Biography
Born in Halifax County, Virginia, where his parents were living by 1783, Davenport completed preparatory studies and received a license to operate as a merchant in Meadville, Virginia. He was a captain in the county militia during the War of 1812.

Davenport was elected as a Jacksonian to the Nineteenth through the Twenty-second Congresses and elected as an Anti-Jacksonian to the Twenty-third Congress (March 4, 1825March 3, 1835).  He chaired the Committee on Public Expenditures (Twenty-third Congress).
He was an unsuccessful candidate for reelection in 1834 to the Twenty-fourth Congress.
He died near Meadville, on November 17, 1838.

Elections

1825; Davenport was elected to the U.S. House of Representatives unopposed.
1827; Davenport was re-elected unopposed.
1829; Davenport was re-elected unopposed.
1831; Davenport was re-elected unopposed.
1833; Davenport was re-elected with 51.04% of the vote, defeating Independents Benjamin W.S. Cabell and Oden G. Clay.
1835; Davenport lost his bid for re-election.

Sources

Obituary with death date in Lynchburg Virginian, November 19, 1838.

1838 deaths
Year of birth unknown
People from Halifax County, Virginia
American militiamen in the War of 1812
Jacksonian members of the United States House of Representatives from Virginia
19th-century American politicians
National Republican Party members of the United States House of Representatives from Virginia
American militia officers